Tanu may refer to:

People
 Malietoa Tanumafili I (1879–1939), Samoan prince
 Tanu Nona (1902–1980), Australian pearler and politician
 Tanu Roy (born 1980), Indian actress and model
 Tanu (born 1997), a Finnish/Assyrian rapper

Places
 Tanganyika African National Union (TANU)
 Tanu (Haida village), a village of the Haida people on Haida Gwaii, British Columbia, Canada
 Tanu, Canada, a National Historic Site of Canada in British Columbia
 Tanu, Sarawak, Malaysia, a town near Tusor
 Tanu Forest Park, Gambia

Other uses
 A tanu (The Witness), a 1969 Hungarian film
 CCGS Tanu, a Canadian fisheries patrol vessel
 Pseudophilautus tanu, a frog of the family Rhacophoridae
 Tanu, a character in the children's fantasy novel Fablehaven by Brandon Mull
 The Tanu, a race from the Saga of Pliocene Exile book series by Julian May

See also
 Le Tanu, a commune in the Manche department, France
 Tanu Rud (disambiguation)
 Tanus (disambiguation)